Rhaptopetalum geophylax is a species of plant in the family Lecythidaceae. It is endemic to Cameroon.  Its natural habitat is subtropical or tropical moist lowland forests. It is threatened by habitat loss.

References

Flora of Cameroon
geophylax
Near threatened plants
Taxonomy articles created by Polbot
Taxa named by Martin Cheek